Compass Bank may refer to:
 BBVA USA, formerly BBVA Compass and Compass Bancshares, a defunct American bank
 Compass Bank, a bank in New Bedford, Massachusetts, USA which was acquired by Sovereign Bank in 2004